The 2017–18 W-League season was the tenth season of the W-League, the Australian national women's association football competition.

Clubs

Stadia and locations

Personnel and kits

Managerial changes

Transfers

Foreign players
 
The following do not fill a Visa position:
A Australian citizens who have chosen to represent another national team;
G Guest Players

Regular season

The regular season was played between 27 October 2017 and 4 February 2018, over 14 rounds, with each team playing twelve matches.

League table

Fixtures
Individual matches are collated at each club's season article.

Finals series

Semi-finals

Grand final

Regular-season statistics

Top scorers

Own goals

Hat-tricks

End-of-season awards
The following end of the season awards were announced at the 2017–18 Dolan Warren Awards night on 30 April 2018.
 Julie Dolan Medal – Sam Kerr (Perth Glory) and Clare Polkinghorne (Brisbane Roar)
 NAB Young Footballer of the Year – Ellie Carpenter (Canberra United)
 Golden Boot Award – Sam Kerr (Perth Glory) (13 goals)
 Goalkeeper of the Year – Mackenzie Arnold (Brisbane Roar)
 Coach of the Year – Melissa Andreatta (Brisbane Roar)
 Fair Play Award – Melbourne Victory
 Referee of the Year – Casey Reibelt
 Goal of the Year – Lisa De Vanna (Sydney FC v Canberra United, 15 December 2017)

See also

 2017–18 Adelaide United W-League season
 2017–18 Brisbane Roar W-League season
 2017–18 Canberra United W-League season 
 2017–18 Melbourne City W-League season
 2017–18 Melbourne Victory W-League season
 2017–18 Newcastle Jets W-League season
 2017–18 Perth Glory W-League season
 2017–18 Sydney FC W-League season
 2017–18 Western Sydney Wanderers W-League season

References

 
Australia
2017–18 in Australian women's soccer
2017–18
2018 in women's association football